Liam Raymond Davis (born 4 April 2000) is a Zimbabwean swimmer. He competed in the men's 100 metre breaststroke event at the 2018 FINA World Swimming Championships (25 m), in Hangzhou, China.

References

External links
 

2000 births
Living people
Zimbabwean male breaststroke swimmers
Place of birth missing (living people)
Swimmers at the 2018 Summer Youth Olympics